Göllüce can refer to:

 Göllüce, İznik
 Göllüce, Kurşunlu